The St. Mary's Episcopal Church in Franklin, Louisiana, United States, is a historic church at 805 1st Street. Designed by New Orleans architect James Freret for R.W. Micou, it was advertised by the Lhote Lumber Company in its 1883 Buyers' Guide.

The current Gothic Revival church building was built in 1872 and added to the National Register of Historic Places in 1980.  A parish of the Episcopal Diocese of Louisiana, St. Mary's also maintains the historic Trowbridge House just across the street.

It was deemed "significant in the area of architecture as a fine example of a mid-nineteenth century Gothic Revival church. Although this was a style
for church architecture which flourished in the eastern states, St. Mary's is one of only about 12 extant good examples in Louisiana."

The church was organized in 1846 and was accepted into its diocese in 1847.

St. Mary's Church holds regular Christian formation programs and Sunday worship at 10:30.  The Rev. Stephen Crawford is rector.

References

External links
Official Website
James Freret Office Records, Southeastern Architectural Archive, Special Collections Division, Tulane University Libraries.

Churches completed in 1872
Episcopal church buildings in Louisiana
Churches on the National Register of Historic Places in Louisiana
Carpenter Gothic church buildings in Louisiana
Churches in St. Mary Parish, Louisiana
19th-century Episcopal church buildings
National Register of Historic Places in St. Mary Parish, Louisiana
1872 establishments in Louisiana